Daisy is a Java/XML open-source content management system based on the Apache Cocoon content management framework.  Today, Daisy is in use at major corporations for intranet knowledge bases, product and/or project documentation, and management of content-rich websites.

Content management system 
The content is stored in so-called Daisy documents. These documents are managed by the Daisy Repository Server. Documents consist of parts. Parts can be anything from required blocks of text to specified fields with restricted content. By creating specific document types, different types of information can be handled differently. Simple documents just hold text and hyperlinks. By including a query in a document it is easy to create documents that aggregate other documents.

Each document can have multiple variants. A variant can be a version or a translated document (language variant). Variants can be used to mark specific versions, e.g., all documents referring to version XYZ of the software described.

Editing of Daisy documents is supported with a WYSIWYG Wiki-like editing environment.

Site navigation trees can be made more dynamic using queries generating navigation hierarchies.

Daisy is hierarchy-free and has a clear separation between repository server and front-end application. This allows for easy extension of the functionality.

Other features are:
 revision control
 centralized ACL system
 Jakarta Lucene based full-text indexing
 book publishing which allows for the generation of nicely formatted books with table of contents, section numbering, cross-referencing, footnotes and index
 faceted browsing
 The Daisy 2.0 version added JBoss jBPM-based workflow

Requirements 
The packaged versions of Daisy 2.2 includes everything required to run Daisy, except for:
 a Java Virtual Machine (JVM): Java 1.5 or higher required
 a MySQL database: version 4.1.7 or higher required (5 also fine)

Daisy can work with other databases, such as PostgreSQL, but only MySQL is supported.

Daisy is thoroughly tested on Linux, Mac OS X and Windows NT/2000/XP, but should also run on other Unix operating systems such as Solaris. Additionally, Daisy displays properly in most major browsers: Internet Explorer and Mozilla/Firefox with fallback to a text area on other browsers.

Outerthought 
Outerthought is an Open Source Java & XML company. Outerthought supports Daisy and provides support to its community of users and contributors.

Documentation 
The documentation for Daisy runs on Daisy itself, and can be viewed online as HTML or downloaded in PDF as a "Daisy book".

See also 

 Daisy's front-end runs on Apache Cocoon
List of content management systems

References

External links
 Official website
 Infoworld article on Daisy (July 11, 2005)
 Geekscape Content Management System (CMS) investigation (August 19, 2005)

Free content management systems
Content management systems